Just Outside of Town is the fourth album by the Brooklyn-based soul/funk band Mandrill. Released in October 1973 on Polydor Records, the album reached No. 8 on the Billboard Top Soul Albums chart.

Track listing 
All songs written and arranged by Mandrill

"Mango Meat" 	4:44 	
"Never Die" 	3:22 	
"Love Song" 	5:42 	
"Interlude" 	0:24 	
"Fat City Strut" 	3:19 	
"Two Sisters of Mystery" 	3:39 	
"Afrikus Retrospectus" 	7:42 	
"She Ain't Lookin' Too Tough" 	5:01 	
"Aspiration Flame" 	5:00

Personnel 
 Carlos D. Wilson - trombone, flute, alto saxophone, timbales, percussion, guitar, vocals
 Louis Wilson - trumpet, congas, percussion, vocals
 Ricardo Wilson - tenor saxophone, percussion, vocals
 Claude "Coffee" Cave - organ, vibes, piano, synthesizer, percussion, clavinet, vocals
 Frederick "Fudgie Kae" Solomon - bass, acoustic guitar, percussion, vocals, piano
 Omar Mesa - lead guitar, percussion, vocals
 Neftali Santiago -drums, percussion, vocals

Charts

Singles

Samples & Covers
Jungle Brothers sampled "Mango Meat" on their song "Straight Out The Jungle", from Straight out the Jungle, in 1988.
Public Enemy sampled "Two Sisters Of Mystery" on their song "By The Time I Get to Arizona", from Apocalypse 91... The Enemy Strikes Black, in 1991.
The Avalanches sampled "Fat City Strut" on their song "Electricity", from Since I Left You, in 2000.

References

External links
 Mandrill-Just Outside Of Town at Discogs

1973 albums
Mandrill (band) albums
Polydor Records albums
Albums recorded at Electric Lady Studios
Albums recorded at Sound City Studios